George W. Barber (a.k.a. George Barber Jr.) is an American businessman, real estate developer and philanthropist from Alabama.

Early life
Barber's father, George Warren Barber, founded Barber Dairies in the 1930s. It became the largest dairy company in Alabama. His father promoted the use of pasteurized milk in the United States.

Career
Barber was a racecar driver. Later, he was a real estate developer and served as the Chairman of Barber Dairies. In 1998, he sold the family business to Dean Foods. In 2003, he established Barber Motorsports Park in Leeds, near Birmingham.

Motorcycle collection
Barber started collecting motorcycles in the 1970s. It is "the world's largest collection of motorcycles," and it is in the Guinness Book of Records with more than 1,400 motorcycles covering all timelines from vintage to modern. He was inducted into the Motorcycle Hall of Fame in 2014.

References

Living people
Businesspeople from Birmingham, Alabama
Philanthropists from Alabama
American collectors
Date of birth missing (living people)
Year of birth missing (living people)